Mariano Sabino Otero (August 29, 1844 – February 1, 1904) was a Congressional delegate from the Territory of New Mexico, nephew of Miguel Antonio Otero (I) and cousin of Miguel Antonio Otero (II).

Born in Peralta, New Mexico, Otero attended private and parochial schools and St. Louis University, Missouri.
He engaged in commercial pursuits and stock raising, and subsequently became a banker.
He was probate judge of Bernalillo County in 1871–1879.
He was also nominated by the Democratic State convention as a candidate for Delegate to the Forty-fourth Congress, but declined.

Otero was elected as a Republican to the Forty-sixth Congress (March 4, 1879 – March 3, 1881).
He declined to be a candidate for renomination in 1880, but instead engaged in his former business pursuits.

Otero served as commissioner of Bernalillo County in 1884–1886.
He was an unsuccessful candidate for election in 1888 to the Fifty-first Congress and in 1890 to the Fifty-second Congress.
He moved to Albuquerque, New Mexico, in 1889, and was interested in the manufacture of sulphur and engaged in banking.
He died in Albuquerque, and was interred in Santa Barbara Cemetery.

See also
 List of Hispanic Americans in the United States Congress

Sources

1844 births
1904 deaths
County commissioners in New Mexico
Delegates to the United States House of Representatives from New Mexico Territory
People of Santa Fe de Nuevo Mexico
American people of Spanish descent
Neomexicanos
Hispanic and Latino American members of the United States Congress
19th-century American politicians
New Mexico Republicans
People from Valencia County, New Mexico
Saint Louis University alumni
Hispanic and Latino American people in New Mexico politics